Robbie Beckett (born 14 August 1972) is an Australian former professional rugby league footballer who played in the 1990s and 2000s. He played at club level for the Penrith Panthers, the Wests Tigers and Halifax Blue Sox. Beckett represented Australia at the 1996 Super League World Nines. Beckett is the older brother of the rugby league and rugby union footballer; Lenny Beckett.

Playing career
Beckett made his debut for Penrith against Balmain in Round 6 1994.  In 1995 and 1996, Beckett was selected to play for NSW City.

In 1997, Beckett only played in 9 games during the club's season in the Super League but played in both of Penrith's finals games against Canterbury and Canberra scoring a try in both matches.

Beckett's best try scoring season was in 1998 when he scored 12 tries in 24 games.

Beckett played finals football again with Penrith when they finished 5th in 2000. Beckett played in both finals games scoring a try in the 28-10 elimination finals loss to Parramatta.  In 2001, Beckett made 21 appearances as Penrith finished last on the table claiming the wooden spoon. Beckett's last game for Penrith in first grade was a 60-18 loss against eventual premiers Newcastle.

In 2002, Beckett joined English side Halifax Blue Sox and played one season with the club before returning to Australia.  Beckett finished his career with the Wests Tigers in 2003.

References

1972 births
Living people
Australian rugby league players
Australian expatriate sportspeople in England
Halifax R.L.F.C. players
New South Wales City Origin rugby league team players
Penrith Panthers players
Rugby articles needing expert attention
Rugby league players from Sydney
Wests Tigers players